Martin Patzelt (born 23 July 1947) is a German politician of the Christian Democratic Union (CDU) who served as a member of the Bundestag from the state of Brandenburg from 2013 until 2021.

Political career 
Patzelt first became a member of the Bundestag in the 2013 German federal election. Throughout his time in parliament, he was a member of the Committee on Human Rights and Humanitarian Aid and the Committee on Family, Senior Citizens, Women and Youth. He attracted attention for taking two Eritrean refugees into his home in the wake of the 2015 European migrant crisis.

Following the 2017 elections, Patzelt announced that he would not stand in the 2021 elections but instead resign from active politics by the end of the parliamentary term.

Political positions
In June 2017, Patzelt voted against Germany's introduction of same-sex marriage.

Ahead of the Christian Democrats’ leadership election in 2018, Patzelt publicly opposed Friedrich Merz’s candidacy to succeed Angela Merkel as the party’s chair. In 2019, he joined 14 members of his parliamentary group who, in an open letter, called for the party to rally around Merkel and party chairwoman Annegret Kramp-Karrenbauer amid criticism voiced by Merz and Roland Koch.

In September 2020, Patzelt was one of 15 members of his parliamentary group who joined Norbert Röttgen in writing an open letter to Minister of the Interior Horst Seehofer which called on Germany and other EU counties to take in 5000 immigrants who were left without shelter after fires gutted the overcrowded Mória Reception and Identification Centre on the Greek island of Lesbos.

References

External links 

  
 Bundestag biography 

1947 births
Living people
Members of the Bundestag for Brandenburg
Members of the Bundestag 2017–2021
Members of the Bundestag 2013–2017
Members of the Bundestag for the Christian Democratic Union of Germany
People from Frankfurt (Oder)